Deandra is a given name. Notable people with the name include:

Deandra Dottin (born 1991), Barbadian cricketer and track and field athlete
Deandra van der Colff (born 1993), Botswanan swimmer

Characters
Deandra Reynolds, bartender from It's Always Sunny in Philadelphia

Feminine given names